Pulok Kumar Mukherjee is an Indian scientist working as the Director of Institute of Bioresources and Sustainable Development, an autonomous Institute under Department of Biotechnology, Govt. of India, Imphal, Manipur, India; as well as an Associate Editor of the Phytomedicine Plus; Consulting Editor of the Pharmacological Research published by Elsevier. He is the Professor (on lien) of Pharmaceutical technology at the Jadavpur University and former Director of the School of Natural Product Studies, Jadavpur University, Kolkata, India.

Biography
Mukherjee obtained both his PhD and Master's in pharmacy from Jadavpur University in Jadavpur, Kolkata. He then attended Leiden/Amsterdam Center for Drug Research in the Netherlands as a postdoctoral researcher. Mukherjee is a past President of the International Society for Ethnopharmacology and Founder member of the Society for Ethnopharmacology, India (SFE-India), Kolkata, India.

Research
Prof. Mukherjee is working on traditional medicine inspired drug discovery and development from Indian medicinal plants with major emphasis on their validation, formulation and standardization, metabolomic profiling, safety documentation and related aspects. He has made significant contributions on translational research in biomedical sciences for drug discovery and development through evidence-based validation and documentation of traditional medicine for their quality, safety and efficacy. He has made several innovative and outstanding contributions in academics and research in the area of natural product studies, Ethnopharmacology and evidence-based validation of herbs used in traditional medicine. He has contributed a lot on evaluation and validation of drugs and pharmaceuticals from medicinal plants including their chemo-profiling, quality evaluation, safety documentation, related to the bioprospecting of medicinal plants leading to the development of safe and efficacious products.
Prof Mukherjee has also been working for the development of an electronic probe device (e-nose) with the help of Raman and Infrared spectroscopy which can have useful for evaluation of medicinal plants and products having adulterants and contaminants. Prof. Mukherjee and his team have been working on the DNA barcoding and Next generation sequencing for quality evaluation of MAPs. He has synergized different research activities to catalyze and strengthen the bio-economy from bioresources of the North Eastern Region of India. Prof. Mukherjee has also been instrumental in establishing the Indian SARS-CoV-2 Genomics Consortium (INSACOG) facility at IBSD, Imphal.
 
His multidisciplinary concerted efforts for drug development from Indian medicinal plants (IMPs) and their validation with special emphasis on quality control,  safety-related quality issues, synergy, value-added formulation development,  metabolomics, marker profiling and related aspects have been appreciated by several industries and products have been developed, technology has been transferred through University-Industry collaborations. His works on systematic data mining for validation of Indian medicinal plants are useful bio-prospecting tools for developing safe and effective products with scientific evidence, to bridge the gap between traditional medicine and modern science. . He is a fellow of the National Academy of Science, India (FNASc); the Royal Society of Chemistry, UK (FRSC) and fellow of the National Academy of Agricultural Sciences, India (FNAAS). 
 
Major highlights are as follows:
 Traditional medicine inspired approaches for drug discovery and development from natural products.
 Translational aspects of Medicinal plants through the multidisciplinary research approach
 Ethnopharmacology and evidence-based validation of herbs used in Indian systems of medicine.
 Metabolomics for evaluation of medicinal plants through evidence-based approaches.
 Quality control, standardization and evaluation of therapeutic efficacy
 Bio-prospecting of therapeutically potent metabolites from medicinal plants
 Evaluation of quality-related safety profile of the MAPs and herbal products
 Development of Bioeconomy from Bioresources
 Ethnopharmacology and Traditional Medicine 

Mukherjee and his group has published more than 230 publications in peer-reviewed reputed journals and contributed over 20 book chapters and authored, edited 7 books on different aspects of quality control, validation, efficacy evaluation, safety documentation on herbs and herbal formulations. His works will help in the development of standardized, synergistic, safe and effective medicinal plants, which can offer economical and better alternatives in health care for the community at large.

Evidence-Based Validation of Herbal Medicine, Elsevier.
Quality Control and Evaluation of Herbal Drugs, Elsevier.
Evaluation of Herbal Medicinal Products, Pharmaceutical Press.
Natural Medicines - Clinical Efficacy, Safety and Quality, CRC Press.

Awards

 Fellow of the National Academy of Agricultural Sciences, India (FNAAS) 
 Fellow of the National Academy of Science, India (FNASc) 
 NASI - Reliance Industries Platinum Jubilee Award 
 Fellow of the Royal Society of Chemistry, UK (FRSC)
 DBT-TATA Innovation Fellowship Award, from Department of Biotechnology, Government of India, New Delhi. 
 Birbal Sahni Birth Century Gold Medal Award
 Fellow of West Bengal Academy of Science & Technology, India (FWAST)
 Commonwealth Academic Staff Fellowship Award
 Biotechnology Overseas, Award from Department of Biotechnology, Government of India, New Delhi.
 Best Pharmaceutical Scientist of the year from the Association of Pharmaceutical Teachers’ of India
 Young Pharmacy Teacher Award-2002, from Association of Pharmacy Teachers of India
 DST BOYSCAST fellowship Department of Science and Technology, Govt of India

Dissemination of knowledge
Mukherjee has been working extensively on the dissemination of knowledge for the promotion of ethnopharmacology, ethnomedicine and Medicinal and aromatic plant research at large. He has organized several very effective and successful International/National conferences/ workshops/symposiums with the involvement of renowned scientists and resource persons all over the world to develop national international collaborations and coordination. Some of his contributions on the dissemination of knowledge in this area are as follows:

 Chairman, Scientific Services (2022), 9th International Congress of Society for Ethnopharmacology (SFEC 2022) at JSS College of Pharmacy, Mysuru, India.
 Chairman, Scientific Services (2021), 8th International Congress of Society for Ethnopharmacology (SFEC 2021) at Bharati Vidyapeeth Deemed University, Pune, India.
 Chairman, Scientific Services (2020), 7th International Congress of Society for Ethnopharmacology (SFEC 2020) at Jamia Hamdard, New Delhi, India.
 Chairman, Scientific Services (2019), 6th International Congress of Society for Ethnopharmacology (SFEC 2019) at Manipal Academy of Higher Education, Manipal, Karnataka, India.
 Organizing Secretary (2018), 5th National Convention & National Symposium at Jadavpur University, Kolkata, India.
 Co-ordinator, UK India Newton Bhabha Researcher Links workshop (2018) at Jadavpur University, Kolkata, India.
 Chairman, Scientific services (2018), 18th International Congress of International Society for Ethnopharmacology and 5th International Congress of Society for Ethnopharmacology (ISE SFEC 2018) at University of Dhaka, Bangladesh.
 Organizing Secretary (2017), 4th Convention & National Seminar at School of  Natural Product Studies, Jadavpur University, Kolkata, India.
 Chairman, Scientific services (2017), 4th International Congress of the Society for Ethnopharmacology, India (SFEC-2017) at Uka Tarsadia University, Bardoli, Surat, Gujarat, India.  
 Organizing Secretary (2016), International Conclave on Ethnopharmacology in 7th World Ayurveda Congress & Arogya Expo (7th WAC 2016), at Kolkata, India. 
 Organizing Secretary (2016), 3rd National Convention & the National Seminar at Jadavpur University, Kolkata, India.  
 Chairman, Scientific services (2016), 3rd International Congress of the Society for Ethnopharmacology (SFEC 2016), at Raipur, Chhattisgarh, India. 
 Organizing Secretary (2015),  2nd National Convention & the National Seminar at Jadavpur University, Kolkata, India. 
 Chairman, Scientific services (2015), 2nd International Congress of the Society for Ethnopharmacology, India (SFEC - 2015) at Rashtrasant Tukadoji Maharaj Nagpur University, Nagpur, Maharashtra, India.
 Organizing Secretary (2014), 1st Convention & National Seminar at Jadavpur University, Kolkata, India. 
 Chairman, Scientific services (2014), 1st International Congress of the Society for Ethnopharmacology (ICSE - 2014) at Sri Ramachandra University, Chennai, India. 
 Organizing Secretary (2013), DST-SERB National Workshop at Jadavpur University, Kolkata, India. 
 Organizing Secretary (2012), 12th congress of the International Society for Ethnopharmacology [ISE-2012] at Kolkata, India.

References

http://www.ethnopharmacology.in
http://www.ethnopharmacology.org
http://www.pulokmukherjee.in
https://www.ibsd.gov.in

External links

20th-century births
Living people
Academics of King's College London
Academics of the University of London
Academic staff of Jadavpur University
Fellows of the Royal Society of Chemistry
Year of birth missing (living people)
Medical doctors from Kolkata